Klaywatse was a village of the Matilpi group of Kwakwaka'wakw, located to the west of today's Haylahte IR No. 3 in British Columbia, on an island in the mouth of the Adam River.

See also
List of Kwakwaka'wakw villages

References

Kwakwaka'wakw villages
Northern Vancouver Island